Cambarus chaugaensis, the Chauga crayfish or Chauga River crayfish is a species of crayfish in the family Cambaridae. It is endemic to the Carolinas in the United States of America. The common and scientific names refer to the Chauga River of South Carolina, where the first specimens were collected.

The IUCN conservation status of Cambarus chaugaensis is "LC", least concern, with no immediate threat to the species' survival. This status was last reviewed in 2010.

References

Further reading

 
 
 

Cambaridae
Articles created by Qbugbot
Crustaceans described in 1969
Freshwater crustaceans of North America
Taxa named by Horton H. Hobbs Jr.